A Coruña is a comarca in the Galician Province of A Coruña. The overall population of this  local region is 403,386 (2019).

Municipalities
Abegondo, Arteixo, Bergondo, Cambre, Carral, A Coruña, Culleredo, Oleiros and Sada.

References

Comarcas of the Province of A Coruña